Erlend Slokvik (born 24 February 1962) is a Norwegian ski-orienteering competitor. He won a bronze medal in the relay at the World Ski Orienteering Championships in Kuopio in 1988, and another bronze medal at the World Championships in Skellefteå in 1990.

References

1962 births
Living people
Norwegian orienteers
Male orienteers
Ski-orienteers
20th-century Norwegian people